Hollywood on the Rocks is a television series hosted by Chris Gore, produced by Mini Movie Channel and distributed by Ovation TV.

Nestle's Nespresso is set to be one of the partnering sponsors.

References

External links 
Hollywood on the Rocks archived from IMDb

American television talk shows